The Brockmueller Barn is a historic barn near Volin, South Dakota. It was built in 1902 by Charles Brockmueller who had acquired the land in 1893, and designed with "pitched gable roof with side extensions, a random rock-faced stone ground story and horizontal wood siding upper levels.". It was purchased by John Schnider in 1945, and later inherited by his son. It has been listed on the National Register of Historic Places since April 16, 1980.

It is located northwest of Volin.

References

Barns on the National Register of Historic Places in South Dakota
National Register of Historic Places in Yankton County, South Dakota
Buildings and structures completed in 1902
1902 establishments in South Dakota